The 2011 NCAA Division I men's basketball tournament was a single-elimination tournament involving 68 teams to determine the national champion of the 2010–11 NCAA Division I men's basketball season. The 73rd edition of the NCAA tournament began on March 15, 2011, and concluded with the championship game on April 4 at Reliant Stadium in Houston, Texas. This tournament marked the introduction of the "First Four" round and an expansion of the field of participants from 65 teams to 68.  The "South" and "Midwest" regional games were replaced by the monikers "Southeast" and "Southwest" for this tournament, due to the geographical location of New Orleans and San Antonio, respectively.

The Final Four featured no top seeds for the first time since 2006, with the highest remaining seed being West Region winner, #3 Connecticut. For the first time since 2000, a #8 seed advanced to the Final Four as Butler, the national runner-up from the year before, won the Southeast Region. For only the third time ever, a #11 seed advanced to the Final Four as Virginia Commonwealth, one of the "First Four" teams, won the Southwest Region. Those three teams were joined by East Region champion Kentucky, a #4 seed.

Connecticut won its third national championship in the championship game by defeating Butler 53–41.

Upsets ruled the 2011 tournament. The East Region saw its #11 seed, Marquette, advance to the Sweet Sixteen where they were downed by North Carolina. The Southwest Region saw four of its double digit seeds win, as VCU was joined by #12 seed and citymate Richmond, #10 seed Florida State, and #13 seed Morehead State as first round winners. Florida State, VCU, and Richmond all advanced to the Sweet Sixteen from that region, and VCU defeated top-seeded Kansas in the final. Butler and #11 seed Gonzaga advanced from the Southeast Region, with Gonzaga losing in the Round of 32 to BYU.

For the third time in as many appearances, Vanderbilt suffered a defeat to a double digit seed. This time, they were defeated by Richmond as a #5 seed.

The Big East had a record eleven make the tournament (the conference then had 16 total teams). Due to having more than eight teams qualify, it was possible for intra-Big East matchups to occur in the third round. Two of these matchups did occur as Marquette defeated Syracuse in the East while Connecticut defeated Cincinnati in the West. The other Big East teams to qualify were Pittsburgh, who earned the #1 seed in the Southeast Region and were knocked out in the third round by Butler, St. John's, who were the Southeast's #6 seed and were eliminated in their first game by Gonzaga, Louisville, which earned the #4 seed in the Southwest and fell to Morehead State in their first game, Georgetown, who lost to VCU in the first round as a #6 in the Southwest, Notre Dame, the #2 seed in the Southwest who were eliminated by Florida State, Villanova, who were eliminated in an #8 vs #9 matchup against George Mason in the East Region, and West Virginia, the East's #5 seed who lost in the third round to Kentucky.

To date, this is the most recent NCAA tournament in which a mid-major conference saw multiple teams reach the Sweet 16, as both BYU and San Diego State did from the Mountain West Conference.

Northern Colorado, winners of the Big Sky Conference, made its first NCAA Division I tournament.

Tournament procedure

For the first time, a total of 68 teams entered the tournament. Thirty of the thirty-one automatic bids were given to the programs that won their conference tournaments, while the remaining automatic bid went to the Ivy League champion Princeton, as the conference does not hold a tournament. The remaining 37 teams were granted "at-large" bids, which are extended by the NCAA Selection Committee.  All 68 teams were announced on "Selection Sunday" March 13, 2011.

The Selection Committee ranked the entire field from 1 to 68.  The last four at-large teams selected and the four lowest ranked automatic qualifiers played in a "First Four".  The four winners of those games advanced to the main draw of the tournament to play a higher seed. The four lowest ranked teams of the 68 played against each other in a pair of First Four games, with winners advancing to play No. 1 seeds, and the last four at-large teams played in the other two First Four games, with the winners moving on to face the seed they would otherwise be matched up against, as determined by their seed number.

Schedule and venues

The following sites were selected to host each round of the 2011 tournament:

First Four
March 15 and 16
University of Dayton Arena, Dayton, Ohio (Host: University of Dayton)

Second and third rounds
March 17 and 19
Verizon Center, Washington, D.C. (Host: Georgetown University)
McKale Center, Tucson, Arizona (Host: University of Arizona)
Pepsi Center, Denver, Colorado (Host: Mountain West Conference)
Tampa Bay Times Forum, Tampa, Florida (Host: University of South Florida)
March 18 and 20
Quicken Loans Arena, Cleveland, Ohio (Host: Cleveland State University)
Time Warner Cable Arena, Charlotte, North Carolina (Host: University of North Carolina at Charlotte)
United Center, Chicago, Illinois (Host: Big Ten Conference)
BOK Center, Tulsa, Oklahoma (Host: University of Tulsa)

Regional semifinals and Finals (Sweet Sixteen and Elite Eight)
March 24 and 26
West Regional: Honda Center, Anaheim, California (Host: Big West Conference)
Southeast Regional: New Orleans Arena, New Orleans, Louisiana (Host: Tulane University)
March 25 and 27
Southwest Regional: Alamodome, San Antonio, Texas (Host: University of Texas at San Antonio)
East Regional: Prudential Center, Newark, New Jersey (Host: Seton Hall University)

National semifinals and championship (Final Four and championship)
April 2 and 4
Reliant Stadium, Houston, Texas (Hosts: Rice University and University of Houston)

Qualified teams

Automatic bids
The following teams were automatic qualifiers for the 2011 NCAA field by virtue of winning their conference's tournament (except for the Ivy League, whose regular-season champion received the automatic bid).

Tournament seeds (list by region) 

*See First Four.

Bracket

* – Denotes overtime period

Unless otherwise noted, all times listed are Eastern Daylight Time (UTC−04)

First Four – Dayton, Ohio
The First Four games involved eight teams: the four overall lowest-ranked teams, and the four lowest-ranked at-large teams.

All games on truTV. First Four winners enter the second round as their respective seed and in their respective region.

East Regional – Newark, New Jersey

Regional Final Summary

West Regional – Anaheim, California

Regional Final Summary

Southwest Regional – San Antonio, Texas

Regional Final Summary

Southeast Regional – New Orleans, Louisiana

Regional Final Summary

Final Four – Reliant Stadium, Houston, Texas

Game summaries

Consisting of #3-seeded Connecticut, No. 4 Kentucky, No. 8 Butler, and No. 11 Virginia Commonwealth (VCU), the Final Four was considered a result of one of the weakest tournament fields in history.  Regarding the four finalists, there was widespread belief that none of them were among the best teams in the nation.  It was the first time in the tournament's history that a No. 1 or a No. 2 seed had failed to reach the final four.  11th seeded VCU tied a record as the lowest seed to reach the final four.  By virtue of their "first four" appearance, VCU became the first team to reach the final four by winning five tournament games.

The first semifinal featured Butler and VCU, with Butler winning 70–62, despite VCU forward Jamie Skeen leading the scoring with 27 points.

The second semifinal match was between Kentucky and Connecticut. Connecticut had already defeated Kentucky earlier that season 84–67 at the Maui Invitational.  This time, Connecticut won in a close game 56–55, led by Kemba Walker with 18 points.  Connecticut were noted for their defensive effort, which held Kentucky to 34% shooting and also held Kentucky scoreless for over 5 minutes during a spell in the second half.

National Championship

The National Championship game was between Butler, a mid-major university team that was a surprise finalist in the 2010 tournament, and Connecticut, a basketball powerhouse which had previously won the tournament twice under coach Jim Calhoun but had an average regular season finishing 9th in the Big East Conference before winning The Big East tournament with five wins in five consecutive days (never before accomplished in NCAA history).  The championship game was won by Connecticut 53–41. It was a very defensive contest, with Butler having the fewest points in a championship game since 1949.  Butler led at halftime 22–19, but suffered in the second half from poor shooting, making only 6 of 37 shots in the second half.  Butler's 18.8 percent shooting for the entire game was the lowest ever in the NCAA final.  Connecticut contributed to Butler's poor shooting by blocking 10 shots (a championship game record).  Butler was led in scoring by junior guard Shelvin Mack with 13 points, while UConn freshman Jeremy Lamb scored 12 points in the 2nd half.

The win by Connecticut completed a season-ending 11-game win streak that began with the Big East tournament.

The game was widely viewed as a poor quality final.  In reference to the game's first half of play, CBS analyst Greg Anthony said, "This is the worst half of basketball I've ever seen in a national championship game."

Record by conference

The R32, S16, E8, F4, CG, and NC columns indicate how many teams from each conference were in the round of 32 (third round), Sweet 16, Elite Eight, Final Four, championship game, and national champion, respectively.
The SWAC and Sun Belt Conference each had one representative, eliminated in the first round.
The America East Conference, Atlantic Sun Conference, Big Sky Conference, Big West Conference, Ivy League, MAAC, MAC, MEAC, MVC, NEC, Patriot League, Southern Conference, Summit League, and WAC each had one representative, eliminated in the second round with a record of 0–1.
The Big South and Southland each had one representative, eliminated in the second round with a record of 1-1.
 The Big East Conference had a record 11 teams in the tournament, which made intra-Big East matchups possible prior to the Elite Eight. There were two such matchups in the 3rd round, Syracuse vs. Marquette and Connecticut vs. Cincinnati. The two Big East teams to make the Sweet Sixteen beat conference opponents to advance to that round.

Media

Television
On April 22, 2010, it was announced that the NCAA had reached a new 14-year, US$10.8 billion deal with CBS Sports and Time Warner-owned Turner Sports (by way of TBS, TNT and truTV) for the rights to broadcast the NCAA tournament from 2011 until 2024, marking the first time every game in the tournament would be telecast on a national basis.

CBS and Turner pooled their resources for the tournament, with members of the NBA on TNT crew joining CBS's established March Madness broadcasters. Coverage will originate from the CBS Broadcast Center in New York City and Turner's Atlanta studios.

The tournament television ratings report shows the tournament had an average of 10.2 million viewers per game, an increase from the 2005 tournament when it drew an average of 10.6 million (6.4 Nielsen rating). The championship game recorded an 11.7 rating and drew 20.1 million viewers.

TruTV, which up to that point had never aired any live sports programming, saw a surge in carriage deals for its high definition feed with several major providers including AT&T U-verse, Verizon FiOS, Comcast, Charter Communications, Cablevision, Cox Cable and RCN.

Studio hosts
Greg Gumbel (New York City and Houston) First Four, Second round, Third round, Regionals, Final Four and National Championship Game
Ernie Johnson Jr. (New York City and Atlanta) First Four, Second round, Third round and Regional Semi-Finals
Matt Winer (Atlanta) First Four, Second round and Third round

Studio analysts
Greg Anthony (New York City and Houston) First Four, Second round, Third round, Regionals, Final Four and National Championship Game
Charles Barkley (New York City and Houston) First Four, Second round, Third round, Regionals, Final Four and National Championship Game
Tom Crean (Atlanta) First Four and Second round
Seth Davis (Atlanta and Houston) First Four, Second round, Third round, Regional Semi-Finals, Final Four and National Championship Game
Tom Izzo (Atlanta) Regional Semi-Finals
Phil Martelli (Atlanta) Third round
Rick Pitino (New York City) Third round
Kenny Smith (New York City and Houston) First Four, Second round, Third round, Regionals, Final Four and National Championship Game
Steve Smith (Atlanta) First Four, Second round, Third round and Regional Semi-Finals
Jay Wright (New York City) Regional Finals

Announcing teams
Jim Nantz/Clark Kellogg/Steve Kerr/Tracy Wolfson First Four at Dayton, Ohio; Second and Third round at Charlotte, North Carolina; East Regional at Newark, New Jersey; Final Four at Houston, TexasKerr joined Nantz and Kellogg during the First Four, Final Four, and National Championship games
Marv Albert/Steve Kerr/Craig Sager Second and Third round at Tulsa, Oklahoma; Southwest Regional at San Antonio, Texas
Verne Lundquist/Bill Raftery/Lesley Visser Second and Third round at Denver, Colorado; West Regional at Anaheim, California
Gus Johnson/Len Elmore/Reggie Miller/Marty Snider First Four at Dayton, Ohio; Second and Third round at Cleveland, Ohio; Southeast Regional at New Orleans, LouisianaMiller joined Johnson and Elmore during the Regional games
Kevin Harlan/Reggie Miller/Dan Bonner/Sam Ryan Second and Third round at Tucson, Arizona
Ian Eagle/Jim Spanarkel/David Aldridge Second and Third round at Tampa, Florida
Tim Brando/Mike Gminski/Lewis Johnson Second and Third round at Washington, D.C
Spero Dedes/Bob Wenzel/Jaime Maggio Second and Third round at Chicago, Illinois

Round-by-round game schedule 

All times Eastern and PM

CBS received the same number of "windows", or time slots, for its tournament coverage as in previous years. However, all games will now be nationally rather than regionally televised. The national television broadcasts also allowed for more flexibility in start times. CBS and the Turner networks used the same graphics package and theme music in broadcasting the tournament the only difference between networks is the logo shown on the score bug. In addition, a banner at the top of the screen displayed the scores of other games along with what network they are being broadcast on. Replays feature all four network logos being shown, and for fair use highlight credits by local television stations and other networks such as ESPN, the Turner network name or CBS Sports, followed by  "NCAA" is given as the source. CBS also kept coverage of the Division II final, which is part of the larger contract for this tournament.

Turner Sports aired full-length studio shows before and after each session of play. The pregame show was called Infiniti NCAA Tip-Off and all shows were on TruTV.  The postgame show, called Inside March Madness presented by Buick, alternated between TruTV and TBS.

TruTV had also added coverage of the Reese's College All-Star Game.

Number of games per network 

 CBS: 26
 TBS: 16
 TruTV: 13
 TNT: 12

Radio
Westwood One had live broadcasts of all 67 games.  They will be available both on terrestrial and satellite radio outlets, on NCAA.com, and on CBSSports.com.  The radio contract was extended in January 2011 for multiple tournaments.

First Four
Dave Ryan and Alaa Abdelnaby at Dayton, Ohio

Second and Third round
Scott Graham and Kevin Grevey Second and Third round at Washington, D.C. 
Dave Sims and Bill Frieder Second and Third round at Tucson, Arizona
Ted Robinson and Tom Brennan Second and Third round at Denver, Colorado 
Gary Cohen and Kyle Macy Second and Third round at Tampa, Florida
Kevin Kugler and Pete Gillen Second and Third round at Cleveland, Ohio
Kevin Calabro and Will Perdue Second and Third round at Charlotte, North Carolina
Wayne Larrivee and John Thompson Second and Third round at Chicago, Illinois
Brad Sham and Reid Gettys Second and Third round at Tulsa, Oklahoma

Regionals
Ian Eagle and John Thompson East Regional at Newark, New Jersey
Kevin Kugler and Pete Gillen Southeast Regional at New Orleans, Louisiana
Kevin Harlan and Kevin Grevey Southwest Regional at San Antonio, Texas
Wayne Larrivee and Bill Frieder West Regional at Anaheim, California

Final four
Kevin Kugler, John Thompson and Bill Raftery at Houston, Texas

Internet/other video
All games are expected to be streamed at NCAA.com or CBSSports.com, as in the past; with the new rights deal, NCAA.com and the game streaming is now managed by Turner Interactive.  The iPhone app which allowed streaming of games on the iPhone in previous years, and had cost about ten dollars, has received two upgrades: it is compatible with iPad, and it is now free of charge. However, with the CBS-Turner agreement allowing all games in the tournament to be available on a national basis (see above), Mega March Madness, a DirecTV-only service, has been discontinued.

International
 : TSN acquired Canadian rights for the tournament, rights which were previously held by The Score. This is apparently the result of a larger international rights deal between the NCAA and ESPN International (which owns a minority interest in TSN).  TSN had its own studio programming hosted by Dan Shulman and James Cybulski, and game coverage came from CBS and Turner.  Unlike the Score, which had whiparound coverage, TSN and TSN2 showed entire games.  Sometimes, both channels aired games, but on Friday of the first weekend, no games were shown due to previous programming commitments on both channels.  TSN.ca also streamed first-round games to those with Canadian IP addresses.
: Basketball TV planned to broadcast the NCAA tournament using the American feed.
Worldwide: The NCAA.com video and audio streams were available with no blackout restrictions anywhere in the world.

See also
 2011 NCAA Division II men's basketball tournament
 2011 NCAA Division III men's basketball tournament
 2011 NCAA Division I women's basketball tournament
 2011 NCAA Division II women's basketball tournament
 2011 NCAA Division III women's basketball tournament
 2011 National Invitation Tournament
 2011 Women's National Invitation Tournament
 2011 NAIA Division I men's basketball tournament
 2011 NAIA Division II men's basketball tournament
 2011 NAIA Division I women's basketball tournament
 2011 NAIA Division II women's basketball tournament
 2011 College Basketball Invitational
 2011 CollegeInsider.com Postseason Tournament

References

External links

NCAA Division I men's basketball tournament
2011
Basketball in Houston
NCAA Division I Men's Basketball
NCAA Division I Men's Basketball
NCAA Division I men's basketball tournament
NCAA Division I men's basketball tournament
NCAA Division I men's basketball tournament